The Consensus 1992 College Basketball All-American team, as determined by aggregating the results of four major All-American teams.  To earn "consensus" status, a player must win honors from a majority of the following teams: the Associated Press, the USBWA, The United Press International and the National Association of Basketball Coaches.

1992 Consensus All-America team

Individual All-America teams

AP Honorable Mention:

Damon Bailey, Indiana
Vin Baker, Hartford
Tony Bennett, Wisconsin–Green Bay
Nathan Call, BYU
Sam Cassell, Florida State
Parrish Casebier, Evansville
Doug Christie, Pepperdine
Hubert Davis, North Carolina
Terry Dehere, Seton Hall
Acie Earl, Iowa
LaPhonso Ellis, Notre Dame
Tom Gugliotta, North Carolina State
Penny Hardaway, Memphis State
Grant Hill, Duke
Robert Horry, Alabama
Allan Houston, Tennessee
Alonzo Jamison, Kansas
Herb Jones, Cincinnati
Popeye Jones, Murray State
Adonis Jordan, Kansas
Terrell Lowery, Loyola Marymount
Jamal Mashburn, Kentucky
Jim McCoy, Massachusetts
Chris Mills, Arizona
Oliver Miller, Arkansas
Eric Montross, North Carolina
Tracy Murray, UCLA
Terrence Rencher, Texas
Sean Rooks, Arizona
Rodney Rogers, Wake Forest
Jalen Rose, Michigan
Reggie Slater, Wyoming
Chris Smith, Connecticut
Elmore Spencer, UNLV
Bryant Stith, Virginia
Rex Walters, Kansas
Clarence Weatherspoon, Southern Mississippi
Henry Williams, UNC Charlotte
Randy Woods, La Salle

References

NCAA Men's Basketball All-Americans
All-Americans